Rebel's Romance (foaled March 19, 2018) is an Irish-bred multiple Group/Grade I turf winning Thoroughbred racehorse. As a three-year-old in 2022 he won the UAE Derby on the dirt in Dubai. His major wins in 2022 include the Grosser Preis von Berlin and Preis von Europa in Germany and the Breeders' Cup Turf at Keeneland where he set a new track record.

Background
Rebel's Romance is a dark bay or brown gelding who was bred and owned by Sheikh Mohammed's Godolphin organisation. He was sent into training with Charlie Appleby, whose stable is based at Newmarket, Suffolk, but typically relocates to Dubai in winter.

He was sired by Dubawi a top-class son of Dubai Millennium, whose wins included the Irish 2,000 Guineas and the Prix Jacques Le Marois. At stud, Dubawi has been a highly successful breeding stallion, siring major winners such as Monterosso, Al Kazeem, Makfi, Lucky Nine and Night of Thunder. 

Rebel's Romance's dam Minidress is a full-sister to Group 3 Nad Al Sheba Trophy winner Volcanic Sky (GB), with both being produced by Group 3 Musidora Stakes - and G1 Epsom Oaks and G1 Yorkshire Oaks placegetter Short Skirt (GB) (Diktat (GB). Rebel Romance's third dam is the excellent producer Much Too Risky (GB) (Bustino (GB), who has four stakes winners to her credit headed by G2 Prix de Pomone winner Whitewater Affair (GB) (Machiavellian), herself the dam of the multiple Group 1-winning Dubai World Cup winner Victoire Pisa (JPN) (Neo Universe (JPN) and G1 Yasuda Kinen winner Asakusa De'nen (GB) (Singspiel  (IRE)). Short Skirt's three-parts brother Little Rock (GB) (Warning (GB) won the G2 Princess of Wales's Stakes, while Much Too Risky is kin to G1 Irish St. Leger hero Arctic Owl (GB) (Most Welcome (GB) and G1 Sydney Cup winner Marooned (GB). Minidress has the two-year-old colt Measured Time (GB) (Frankel (GB)) (2020) and a yearling filly by Golden Horn (GB) (2021) to come.

Racing career

2020: Two-year-old season

Rebel's Romance began his career at Newcastle Racecourse in a Novice Stakes event on the polytrack surface winning the race by a length as the 9/2 third choice in a field of nine runners. He followed up with another impressive by four-length victory at Kempton Park Racecourse as the 11/10 favorite. His management were impressed enough that Rebel's Romance was shipped to the Middle East to continue his campaign rather than be turned out for a spell over winter.

2021: Three-year-old season
Rebel's Romance opened his three-year-old campaign in the UAE 2000 Guineas Trial over 1600 metres at Meydan Racecourse in Dubai. 
Settling in mid-division after the start, Rebel's Romance made smooth progress with a quarter-mile out, leading with one furlong to run to win by a head over the US-bred Mouheeb.

On February 20, in the Al Rajhi Bank Saudi Derby in Saudi Arabia, Rebel's Romance finished fourth to the Japanese-bred Pink Kamehameha. Charlie Appleby was disappointed with the effort, commenting later, "We were expecting a better run than in Saudi." 

In his next assignment Rebel's Romance was entered in the UAE Derby, a major event in the Road to the Kentucky Derby. After starting towards the rear, jockey William Buick pushed Rebel's Romance after being outpaced after one furlong. He moved into second place over a furlong out, then hit the front and was clear in the final 100 yards drawing away to a -length victory. Although Rebel's Romance earned 100 points for the victory which would ensure a spot in the Kentucky Derby, trainer Charlie Appleby wasn't committed for Rebel's Romance's plans.

Although Rebel's Romance qualified to start in the 2021 Kentucky Derby and was in fifth place in the 2021 Road to the Kentucky Derby standings trainer Appleby commented on social media, "Having spoken to His Highness Sheikh Mohammed, we feel (Rebel's Romance) needs more time, and he will now be aimed at the last leg of the US Triple Crown, the G1 Belmont Stakes." After arriving in the United States in May and after a couple of workouts in preparation for the Belmont Stakes, Rebel's Romance was found to have a hind leg infection and was withdrawn from consideration for the event.

2022: Four-year-old season

On November 5, in the Breeders' Cup Turf at Keeneland in the US, Rebel's Romance started slowly. Jockey Doyle commented, "We ended up in a nice position" after the slow break. "I was keen to get him off the inside rail and get him out to the middle of the track. It was a little raw on the turns."  He ran on strongly to win by  lengths from Irish-bred Stone Age and War Like Goddess in third. Rebel's Romance finished the  miles on firm turf in course-record time of 2:26.35.

Statistics

Legend:

 
 
 

Notes:

An (*) asterisk after the odds means Rebel's Romance was the post-time favorite.

Pedigree

Rebel's Romance (IRE) is inbred 4s × 4d to Mr. Prospector

References

2018 racehorse births
Racehorses bred in Ireland
Thoroughbred family 8-d
American Grade 1 Stakes winners
Horse racing track record setters
Breeders' Cup Turf winners
Racehorses trained in the United Kingdom